Shabarimale Swamy Ayyappa is a 1990 Indian Kannada-language film, directed by Renuka Sharma and produced by Subramaniam Kumar and V. Swaminathan. The film stars Sreenivas Murthy, Geetha and Master Sanjay. The film has musical score by K. V. Mahadevan. The film was dubbed in Malayalam under same title and in Tamil as Manikandan.

Cast
 Master Sanjay as Manikanta, Shri Swamy Ayyappa
Sreenivas Murthy as King of Pandalam
Geetha as queen of King of Pandalam 
 Sri Lalitha as Demoness Mahishi
 Sridhar as Shiva
 Sudharani as Parvathi
 Ramesh Bhatt as Minister
 Shivakumar as Lord Indra
 M. S. Umesh as Narada
 Rajanand as Manikanta's Guru
 Master Manjunath
 T. N. Balakrishna
 Anjana as Mohini

Soundtrack
The music was composed by K. V. Mahadevan.

The following are the list of songs in the Kannada version. The lyrics were written by Chi. Udayashankar and Vijaya Narasimha.

The following are the list of songs in the Malayalam dubbed version. The lyrics were written by Sreekumaran Thampi and A. Janaki Amma.

References

External links
 

1990 films
1990s Kannada-language films
Films scored by K. V. Mahadevan
Hindu mythological films
Films directed by Renuka Sharma